Pumpkinhead II: Blood Wings is an American supernatural horror film, it is a direct-to-video sequel to the 1988 horror film Pumpkinhead. In this film, thrill-seeking teens resurrect a demon and come to regret it. The movie is very loosely connected to others in the series. The PC video game Bloodwings: Pumpkinhead's Revenge was released shortly after the film.

Plot
In 1958 in Ferren Woods, a small backwater town, an old blind witch, Ms. Osie, feeds a deformed orphan named Tommy; he is the offspring of Pumpkinhead. As Tommy eats, a car of six thugs pull up and notice him. Convinced that he is some demonic monster, they chase him with switchblade knives and baseball bats; eventually, they corner him at an old iron mine, where they bludgeon him, slash him, and drop him down into the mine, deliberately killing him.

Thirty-five years later, Sheriff Sean Braddock (who was friends with Tommy before his murder), his wife, and his daughter Jenny have come into town. Sean grew up in Ferren Woods and returned when offered a job as the local sheriff. Jenny has often gotten herself into a lot of trouble with the law, especially with her father, who was once a police officer.

At school, Jenny meets a group of wild kids, one of whom is Daniel "Danny" Dixon, whose dad was one of the greasers who had taken part in Tommy's murder 35 years ago and has since become the town judge. The teens sneak off one night and pilfer Sean's car. Danny inadvertently hits Ms. Osie, and when they go to her cabin to check on her, they find a spellbook and vials of blood, which she is planning to use to resurrect Tommy. After Ms. Osie catches them, she orders them out. Danny knocks her down and escapes with a vial of blood.

Danny and his friends attempt to resurrect Tommy's corpse. Jenny notices Ms. Osie's cabin on fire and Danny and his friends flee. Ms. Osie is badly burnt and ends up in the hospital. Unbeknownst to Danny and his friends, the spell they'd attempted worked, resurrecting Tommy in the form of Pumpkinhead. Soon, Judge Dixon's friends begin to meet grisly deaths.

Jenny's father investigates and begins to come to terms with the fact that Tommy is responsible for the murders. Ms. Osie dies, but not before revealing to Sean some clues. Sean discovers the connection between the victims and Pumpkinhead, realizing that the judge is next.

Judge Dixon calls his posse to assist him in killing whatever is murdering his friends. Before they can arrive however, Pumpkinhead brutally murders Judge Dixon, the leader of the Red Wings and the one who commanded his murder. Now that Tommy has avenged his own death, he begins going after Danny and his friends (for fleeing instead of helping Ms. Osie). Sean and the town doctor go into the woods to find Jenny. By this time, Pumpkinhead (Tommy) has murdered Danny and his 3 friends.

He then chases Jenny to the iron mine. Since Sean had saved his life years earlier as a boy, and because Jenny was innocent of hurting Ms. Osie, Tommy allows Jenny to step down to her father safe and sound. However, the judge's posse arrives and shoots Tommy back into the mine, where he had died 35 years earlier. Jenny later apologizes to her father for all the trouble she caused. Just then, Sean finds an old toy fire truck near the mineshaft that he gave to Tommy as a gift for saving his life.

Cast
 Andrew Robinson as Sheriff Sean Braddock
 Barry Davis as Young Sean Braddock
 Ami Dolenz as Jenny Braddock
 Soleil Moon Frye as Marcie
 J. Trevor Edmond as Danny Dixon
 Hill Harper as Peter
 Alexander Polinsky as Paul
 Michael J. Carra as Cory
 Linnea Quigley as Nadine
 Mark McCracken as Pumpkinhead
 Steve Kanaly as Judge Caspar Dixon
 John Gatins as Young Caspar Dixon
 Gloria Hendry as Dr. Delilah Pettibone
 Lilyan Chauvin as Miss Osie
 Caren Kaye as Beth Braddock
 Jean-Paul Manoux as Tommy
 Roger Clinton, Jr. as Mayor Bubba
 Joe Unger as Ernst
 R.A. Mihailoff as "Red" Byers
 Kane Hodder as Keith Knox
 Will Huston as Brian Knox
 Chuck Aronberg as Fred Knox
 Nicole Maggio as The Mute Knox Girl
 Mike Johnson as The Coroner
 Robert Harvey as Henchman #2

Release 
The film was released direct-to-video on October 19, 1994.

The film was first released on DVD by Lionsgate in 2005. A Blu-ray release by Scream Factory (a sub-label of Shout! Factory), under license from current rights holder MGM, was released on October 28, 2014.

Reception

Scott Weinberg of DVD Talk rated it 3/5 stars and wrote that the sequel "holds up pretty darn well". David Johnson of DVD Verdict called it a "fairly entertaining" sequel that doesn't take itself seriously.

Legacy

Video game 
A video game adaptation, Bloodwings: Pumpkinhead's Revenge, was released for DOS in 1995. The game sold poorly at the time of its release and received little attention.

Sequel 
The film was followed by two sequels, Pumpkinhead: Ashes to Ashes and Pumpkinhead: Blood Feud. Both made-for-TV films do not reference the events of Blood Wings.

References

External links
 
 
 

1994 direct-to-video films
1994 horror films
1994 films
American monster movies
American dark fantasy films
Direct-to-video horror films
1990s monster movies
Demons in film
Films about witchcraft
Pumpkinhead (film series)
Direct-to-video sequel films
American supernatural horror films
Films directed by Jeff Burr
Films scored by Jimmy Manzie
1990s English-language films
1990s American films